Wang Sa (real name Heng Kim Ching) (1924 – 18 January 1998) was a Singaporean comedian. He was part of a pair of Singapore comedy duo, who were akin to the Laurel and Hardy of the East.

With Ye Fong, Wang often performed as a duet at the New World Amusement Park and on television in the 1960s and 1970s.  They were also well-known in Malaysia, Taiwan, and Hong Kong.

Wang died of chronic lung disease on 18 January 1998.

At the Star Awards 2003, Wang together with Ye, were awarded posthumously the 40th Anniversary Evergreen Achievement Award.

References

1924 births
1998 deaths
Singaporean television personalities